Thalaivan Sargunam (born 15 May 1985) is an Indian cricketer playing for Royal Challengers Bangalore and Tamil Nadu.

External links
espncricinfo profile

1985 births
Indian cricketers
Living people
Badureliya Sports Club cricketers
Tamil Nadu cricketers
Pondicherry cricketers
Sunrisers Hyderabad cricketers